George Alfred Johnson (20 July 1904–1985) was an English footballer who played in the Football League for Ashington, Reading, Sheffield Wednesday and Watford.

References

1904 births
1985 deaths
English footballers
Association football forwards
English Football League players
Bedlington United A.F.C. players
Ashington A.F.C. players
Sheffield Wednesday F.C. players
Reading F.C. players
Watford F.C. players